John Joseph Benedetto (born July 16, 1939) is a Professor of Mathematics at the University of Maryland, College Park and is a leading researcher in wavelet analysis and Director of the Norbert Wiener Center for Harmonic Analysis and Applications. He was named Distinguished Scholar-Teacher by the University of Maryland in 1999 and has directed 63 Ph.D students. The volume Harmonic Analysis and Applications: In Honor of John Benedetto, edited by Christopher Heil, describes his influence:

John J. Benedetto has had a profound influence not only on the direction of harmonic analysis and its applications, but also on the entire community of people involved in the field.

He was a Senior Fulbright-Hays Scholar (1973–1974), and was awarded the 2011 SPIE Wavelet Pioneer award. He is also a Fellow of the American Mathematical Society and a SIAM Fellow.

Education
Benedetto attended Boston College, graduating in 1960 with a B.A. in Mathematics. He received an M.A. from Harvard University in 1962, and a Ph.D. from the University of Toronto in 1964.  He was the first student to receive a Ph.D. from then 37-year-old Chandler Davis. His dissertation was The Laplace Transform of Generalized Functions.

Garrett Birkhoff was the thesis advisor of Chandler Davis, and Birkhoff did not have a Ph.D. but was a member of the Society of Fellows at Harvard.

Publications
Benedetto is founding Editor-in-Chief of the Journal of Fourier Analysis and Applications, founded in 1994 and published by Springer-Birkhäuser. He is also founding and current editor of the Springer-Birkhäuser Applied and Numerical Harmonic Analysis book series. He has edited or authored 18 books and published over 185 research papers. Some of his books are the following.

Books
 (1971) Harmonic Analysis on Totally Disconnected Sets, Springer Lecture Notes 202
 (1975) Spectral Synthesis, Academic Press
 (1976) Real Variable and Integration with Historical Notes, Teubner Publishers
 (1977) A Mathematical Approach to Mathematics Appreciation, UMD
 (1979) Euclidean Harmonic Analysis, editor, Springer Lecture Notes 779
 (1994) Wavelets: Mathematics and Applications, co-edited with M. Frazier, CRC Press
 (1997) Harmonic Analysis and Applications, CRC Press
 (2001) Modern Sampling Theory: Mathematics and Applications, co-edited with P. Ferreira
 (2004) Sampling, Wavelets, and Tomography,  co-edited with A. Zayed
 (2009) Integration and Modern Analysis,  co-authored with Wojciech Czaja

References

External links
 Speaker Bio from NIST
 Norbert Wiener Center for Harmonic Analysis and Applications
 Homepage
 Mathematics genealogy project
 Journal of Fourier Analysis and Applications
 Applied and Numerical Harmonic Analysis
 Harmonic Analysis and Applications, A volume in honor of John J. Benedetto (C. Heil, editor) Birkhäuser, Boston, 2006.
 ICA Wavelet Pioneers
 Mathematical Genealogy

Living people
1939 births
20th-century American mathematicians
21st-century American mathematicians
Morrissey College of Arts & Sciences alumni
Harvard University alumni
University of Toronto alumni
University of Maryland, College Park faculty
Fellows of the American Mathematical Society